The Optimist Bowl was a postseason college football bowl game played in 1946.  It was held at Public School Stadium (later known as Robertson Stadium), in Houston.

The game was sponsored by the Houston Optimist Club, through agreement reached with the Lone Star Conference in April 1946; the game was to be contested annually for five years, matching the conference champion against a nationally-rated team. Proceeds from the game would be used to benefit homeless boys in Texas. The 1946 conference champion was North Texas State (now the University of North Texas) coached by Odus Mitchell, and organizers extended an invitation to coach Amos Alonzo Stagg and his College of the Pacific team (now the University of the Pacific), who accepted. It was the last game of Stagg's incredible 57 year college football coaching career.

Like some other postseason match-ups of the era, such as the Grape Bowl and the Glass Bowl, results are listed in NCAA records, but the games were not considered NCAA-sanctioned bowls.

Game results

1946: North Texas 14, Pacific 13

See also
 List of college bowl games

References

1946–47 NCAA football bowl games
Defunct college football bowls
North Texas Mean Green football bowl games
Pacific Tigers football bowl games
American football in Houston
Sports competitions in Houston
December 1946 sports events in the United States
1946 in sports in Texas